The Flame of the Yukon is an extant 1917 American silent drama film starring Dorothy Dalton and directed by Charles Miller. The film was produced and distributed by the Triangle Film Corporation.

It is a surviving Triangle film at the Library of Congress, Packard facility.

The story was remade in a 1926 film starring Seena Owen.

Cast
Dorothy Dalton - Ethel Evans / "The Flame"
Melbourne MacDowell - Black Jack Hovey
Kenneth Harlan - George Fowler
Margaret Thompson - Dolly
William Fairbanks - George Fowler (as Carl Ullman)
May Palmer - Mrs. George Fowler

References

External links

1917 films
American silent feature films
1917 drama films
Silent American drama films
American black-and-white films
Films directed by Charles Miller
Triangle Film Corporation films
1910s American films